Erik Anders Pears (born June 25, 1982) is a former American football offensive tackle. He was signed by the Denver Broncos as an undrafted free agent in 2005. He played college football at Colorado State.

He has also played for the Oakland Raiders, Jacksonville Jaguars, Buffalo Bills, and San Francisco 49ers.

Early years 
Pears attended John Fitzgerald Kennedy High School in Denver, Colorado and was a letterman in football, wrestling, and track&field. In football, he was a two-time All-State selection. In wrestling, he was a three-time League titlist. He is married and has four kids.

Professional career

Buffalo Bills
Pears signed a multi-year contract extension on December 13, 2011.

San Francisco 49ers
On March 17, 2015, Pears signed a two-year contract with the San Francisco 49ers. The contract was worth up to $5.7 million, with $1 million guaranteed, and a $500,000 signing bonus.  Pears started every regular season game at right tackle for the 49ers in 2015. On August 29, 2016, Pears was released by the 49ers.

References

External links 
Buffalo Bills bio
Oakland Raiders bio

1982 births
Living people
Players of American football from Salt Lake City
American football offensive tackles
Colorado State Rams football players
Cologne Centurions (NFL Europe) players
Denver Broncos players
Oakland Raiders players
Jacksonville Jaguars players
Buffalo Bills players
San Francisco 49ers players
People from Price, Utah